Clifford Wilson may refer to:
 Clifford Wilson (nephrologist), British nephrologist and professor of medicine
 Clifford E. Wilson, American politician in the New York State Assembly
 Clifford B. Wilson, American politician, Lieutenant Governor of Connecticut
 Cliff Wilson, Welsh snooker player
 C. J. Wilson (defensive end) (Clifford James Wilson), American football player